The Radiation Laboratory at the US University of Massachusetts Lowell serves the Department of Applied Physics among others. The laboratory contains a 1 MW pool-type nuclear research reactor (UMLRR) that has been operating since 1974, a 300 kCi Co-60 gamma ray source, and a 5.5 MV Van de Graaff accelerator.

Reactor 

First startup was January 2, 1975. A budget for the reactor is not provided from the university or from the state; funding comes from grants and the United States Department of Energy.

Conversion to LEU 
The UMass Lowell reactor has been one of the many research reactors to make the conversion from high-enriched Uranium to low-enriched Uranium as a part of anti-terrorism security measures.  The used HEU fuel was reportedly shipped to the Savannah River Site.  The original shipping date was June 2002 but had been postponed many times.  As of present-day the shipments have been made and the reactor is in operation with LEU.

Neutron Irradiation Capabilities 
Neutron irradiation facilities at the UMLRR include: 1x 8-inch beam port, 2x 6-inch beam ports, in-core radiation baskets & flux trap, thermal column, and fast neutron irradiator (FNI).

References

External links 
Applied Physics Departmental Site
ABC's Radioactive Roadtrip Security Review

Nuclear research reactors
R
1975 establishments in Massachusetts